Karen Yuzbashyan (January 6, 1927 – March 5, 2009) was an Armenian historian and specialist in medieval Byzantine and medieval Armenian studies. Yuzbashyan was the author of over 200 books and articles (published in Armenian, Russian, and other languages) on the political, legal, cultural aspects and relations of Byzantium and Armenia, as well as a researcher on the development of Armenian studies.

Biography and scholarly activity
Born in Tiflis in 1927, Yuzbashyan attended Yerevan State University from 1946 to 1948 and studied at Leningrad State University (now Saint Petersburg State University) from 1948 to 1951, receiving his degree in history. He worked and carried out research at the Matenadaran in Yerevan beginning in 1955 until he transferred to the Leningrad branch of the Institute of Oriental Studies in 1958. In 1974, he received his doktor nauk after completing his thesis on the work of the eleventh-century Armenian historian Aristakes Lastivertsi. Four years later, he was promoted to the head of the group for Historical and Cultural Studies at Leningrad's Department of Near Eastern Studies. From 1981 to 1991, Yuzbashyan headed the Leningrad branch of the Palestine Society. Just prior to the Soviet Union's collapse, Yuzbashyan was elected into the Armenian parliament, serving a five-year term (1990–1995) there.

Yuzbashyan's works spanned the early and medieval periods of Armenian history. In 1963, he published the first critical edition of Aristakes Lastivertsi's history (in the original classical Armenian language); he also translated Aristakes' work into Russian in 1968. In 1988, Yuzbashyan published a study on the Bagratuni Kingdom of Armenia and its relations with the Byzantine Empire. Working at the Russian Academy of Sciences, he wrote in many international journals and participated in and organized numerous international congresses and conferences. He taught at Saint Petersburg State University and was the doctoral adviser of many students who entered the field of Byzantine Studies. His most recent work (2005) was the compilation and cataloging of Armenian illuminated manuscripts at the university.

In addition to works concerning Armenia's history, Yuzbashyan also completed a biography on his mentor, Joseph Orbeli, in 1964.

Selected works
 "L'administration byzantine en Arménie aux X e - XI e siècles," Revue des études Arméniennes 10 (1973-1974).
 Armianskie gosudarstva epokhi Bagratidov i Vizantiia v IX–XI vv. [The Armenian state in the Bagratid and Byzantine eras, 9th-11th centuries]. Moscow: Nauka, 1988.
 Avarayri chakatamartits depi Nvarsaki paymanagire [From the Battle of Avarayr to the Treaty of Nvarsak]. Yerevan: Armenian Academy of Sciences, 1989.
 "L'Arménie et les Arméniens vus par Byzance," Byzantinische Forschungen 25 (1999).
"The Armenian War of 450-451: Some Interpretations," Journal of Armenian Studies 7 (Fall-Winter 2002-2003).

Notes

External links
 Friends and Colleagues. "Умер К.Н.Юзбашян." Institute of Oriental Manuscripts of the Russian Academy of Sciences. March 29, 2009. Accessed April 25, 2009.
Yuzbashyan's profile on the National Assembly of Armenia website

1927 births
2009 deaths
Writers from Tbilisi
Yerevan State University alumni
Members of the National Assembly (Armenia)
Ethnic Armenian historians
Soviet historians
Georgian people of Armenian descent